Duke of Mouchy  was a hereditary title in the peerage of Spain, accompanied by the dignity of Grandee and granted in 1747 by Ferdinand VI to Philippe de Noailles, a French military officer. After failure of the 1st Duke's successors in inheriting the dukedom through the established legal procedures, the title expired in the Kingdom of Spain. Withal, it was bestowed by Louis XVIII of France on the eldest son of the 1st Duke in 1817 as a title in the French peerage. 

The Dukedom of Mouchy has since been held by members of a cadet branch of the Noailles family. Owing to the political system of France, a republic, the title is unrecognised (as with all titles). The title could have nonetheless been rehabilitated legally in Spain prior to 1988, when a legal reform was made prohibiting titles with more than forty years of disuse from being revived.

Dukes of Mouchy (Spain, 1747)

The founder of the branch, Philippe de Noailles (1715–1794), comte de Noailles, was a younger brother of Louis, 4th duc de Noailles.  He was named principe de Poix (prince of Poix) in 1729 by King Philip V of Spain. That same year his aunt-in-law Marguerite-Thérèse Rouillé, duchesse de Richelieu, had died, leaving to Philippe the lands of the principality of Poix. It is unknown how many more subsequent holders of this title existed legally in the peerage of Spain.

Philippe de Noailles, 1st Duke of Mouchy

Dukes of Mouchy (France, 1817)

Philippe Louis Marc Antoine, comte de Noailles and Prince of Poix (1752–1819), elder surviving son of the 1st Spanish duque de Mouchy was made duc de Mouchy and a peer of France in 1817 by King Louis XVIII of France.

From the creation of the French peerage, the holders have been:

 Philippe-Louis-Marc-Antoine de Noailles, 1st duc de Mouchy (1752–1819)
 Charles-Arthur-Tristan-Languedoc de Noailles, 2nd duc de Mouchy (1771–1834)
 Antonin Claude Dominique Just de Noailles, 3rd duc de Mouchy (1777–1846)
 Charles-Philippe-Henri de Noailles, 4th duc de Mouchy (1808–1854)
 Antonin-Just-Léon-Marie de Noailles, 5th duc de Mouchy (1841–1909)

The unrecognised titleholders since the establishment of the French Third Republic in 1870 are:
 Henri-Antoine-Marie de Noailles, 6th duc de Mouchy (1890–1947)
 Philippe François Armand Marie de Noailles, 7th duc de Mouchy (1922–2011)
 Antoine-Georges-Marie de Noailles, 8th duc de Mouchy (born 1950)

Noailles

As a male-line descendant of the 3rd Duke of Noailles, the Duke of Mouchy is also in remainder to this peerage and to the title of Duke of Ayen.

Notes

References

Attribution

Further reading
 Héraldique européenne: Maison de Noailles  (European Heraldry: House of Noailles, in French)
 Armory of the French Hereditary Peerage (1814-30)